Ceretic Guletic of Alt Clut was a king of Alt Clut, associated with Dumbarton Castle in the 5th century. He has been identified with Coroticus, a Brittonic warrior addressed in a letter by Saint Patrick. Of Patrick's two surviving letters, one is addressed to the warband of this Coroticus. Bemoaning the capture and enslavement of newly Christianised Irish and their sale to non-Christians, Patrick includes the imprecation:
Soldiers whom I no longer call my fellow citizens, or citizens of the Roman saints, but fellow citizens of the devils, in consequence of their evil deeds; who live in death, after the hostile rite of the barbarians; associates of the Scots and Apostate Picts; desirous of glutting themselves with the blood of innocent Christians, multitudes of whom I have begotten in God and confirmed in Christ.

In the letter Patrick announces that he has excommunicated Coroticus's men. The identification of Coroticus with Ceretic Guletic is based largely on an 8th-century gloss to Patrick's letter. It has been suggested that it was the sending of this letter which provoked the trial which Patrick mentions in the Confession. The "Apostate Picts" are the Southern Picts converted by Saint Ninian and ministered to by Palladius, and who had subsequently left Christianity. The Northern Picts of Fortriu were later converted by Saint Columba in the 6th century, and as they were not yet Christian, they could not be called "apostate".

Ceretic's dates therefore depend on the conclusions of the vast scholarship devoted to discovering the floruit dates of St Patrick, but sometime in the 5th century is probably safe. Ceretic appears also in the Harleian genealogies of the rulers of Alt Clut, which list the names of his father (Cynloyp), grandfather (Cinhil) and great-grandfather (Cluim). It is from the latter source that we get his nickname, Guletic ("Land-holder"). In the Book of Armagh, he is called "Coirthech rex Aloo", "Ceretic, King of the Height [of the Clyde]".

Notes

References

 Smyth, Alfred, Warlords and Holy Men, (Edinburgh, 1984)
 MacQuarrie, Alan, "The Kings of Strathclyde", in A. Grant & K.Stringer (eds.) Medieval Scotland: Crown, Lordship and Community, Essays Presented to G.W.S. Barrow, (Edinburgh, 1993), pp. 1–19.
 Williams, Anne, Smyth, Alfred P., and Kirby, D.P., (eds.), A Biographical Dictionary of Dark Age Britain, (London, 1991), s.v. "Ceretic", pp. 78–8.

Further reading
Iannello, Fausto, "Note storiche sull’Epistola ad Milites Corotici di San Patrizio". In Atti della Accademia Peloritana dei Pericolanti, classe di Lettere, Filosofia e Belle Arti 84 (2008): pp. 275–285. [journal article in Italian]

External links
 Harleian genealogy 5


	 

Monarchs of Strathclyde
5th-century Scottish monarchs